The Daniel Webster Memorial is a monument in Washington, D.C. honoring U.S. statesman Daniel Webster. It is located near Webster's former home at 1603 Massachusetts Avenue Northwest, beside Scott Circle at the intersection of Massachusetts Avenue and Rhode Island Avenue.

The statue of Webster was given to the United States government by Stilson Hutchins, founder of The Washington Post and a fellow native of New Hampshire. An Act of Congress on July 1, 1898 authorized its erection on public grounds and appropriated $4,000 for a pedestal. The memorial was dedicated on January 19, 1900.  On October 12, 2007, the Daniel Webster Memorial was placed on the National Register of Historic Places.  The memorial is also designated a contributing property to the Sixteenth Street Historic District in 1978.

The Daniel Webster Memorial consists of a 12-foot (3.7 m) bronze statue of Webster on an 18-foot (5.5 m) granite pedestal in a sober classical style. The statue was sculpted by Gaetano Trentanove.

On the east and west sides of the pedestal are bronze bas-relief panels illustrating events in Webster's life: the Webster–Hayne debate; the dedication of the Bunker Hill Monument.

The inscription reads:
G. Trentanove F. Galli Fuseri, Firenze 1898 Italia 
(Front of base:) 
DANIEL WEBSTER
LIBERTY AND UNION
NOW AND FOREVER
ONE AND INSEPARABLE 
(Proper left bottom:) 
BORN AT
SALISBURY, N.H.
JAN 18, 1782
DIED AT
MARSHFIELD MASS
OCT. 24, 1852 
(Bottom rear:) 
GIVEN BY STILLSON HUTCHINS
A NATIVE OF N.H.
DEDICATED JAN. 18, 1900 
(Rear top:) 
OUR COUNTRY
OUR WHOLE COUNTRY
AND NOTHING BUT
OUR COUNTRY 
(Proper right, bottom:) 
EXPOUNDER
AND DEFENDER
OF THE CONSTITUTION

See also
 List of public art in Washington, D.C., Ward 2
 List of Registered Historic Places in the District of Columbia
 Outdoor sculpture in Washington, D.C.
 Statue of Daniel Webster (Boston)
 Statue of Daniel Webster (New York City)
 Statue of Daniel Webster (U.S. Capitol)

References

Webster
Embassy Row
Webster
Bronze sculptures in Washington, D.C.
Outdoor sculptures in Washington, D.C.
Webster
1900 sculptures
1900 establishments in Washington, D.C.
Neoclassical sculptures
Memorial